The Hay River is a large river in northern Alberta and southern Northwest Territories, Canada.

It originates in the muskeg of north western Alberta, flows west to British Columbia, then curves northward and returns to Alberta, where it follows a north-northeast course towards the Northwest Territories. After passing over two main waterfalls, the Alexandra Falls and Louise Falls, it flows through the town of Hay River and discharges into the Great Slave Lake. From there, its waters are carried to the Arctic Ocean by the Mackenzie River.

Tributaries of the Hay River are the Chinchaga River, Meander River (in South Slavey: Tahchee), Steen River, Melvin River and Little Hay River. The Hay River effectively flows through the Hay-Zama Lakes. Rainbow Lake is a widening of the river itself.

Communities in the Hay River basin include Rainbow Lake, Zama City, Steen River, Indian Cabins (in South Slavey: Dzêtú) in Alberta and Enterprise and the homonymous Hay River in the Northwest Territories. There are two first nations communities in the river basin: Chateh and Meander River.

Tributaries

Alberta
Rainbow Lake
British Columbia
Little Buffalo River
Bivouac Creek
Kotcho River
Alberta
Shekilie River
White Spruce Creek
Sahcho Creek
Townsoitoi Creek
Little Hay River
Fire Creek
Zama Lake
Sousa Creek
Moody Creek
Zama River
Omega River
Amber River
Mega River
Vardie River
Adair Creek
Chinchaga River
Negus Creek
Henderson Creek
Meander River
Adair Creek
Melvin River
Slavey Creek
Roe River
Lutose Creek
Little Rapids Creek
Steen River
Dizzy Creek
James Creek
Lessard Creek
Jackpot Creek
Northwest Territories
Swan Lake
Goose Egg Lakes
Swede Creek
Twin Falls Creek

See also
List of rivers of Alberta
List of rivers of the Northwest Territories
List of longest rivers of Canada

References

External links
 

Rivers of Alberta
Rivers of the Northwest Territories